Kanpur has been regarded as the largest city of Uttar Pradesh, the largest state in India. This is a list of notable people from Kanpur, this includes, people born in or associated with the city.

A
Ankit Tiwari
Abhay Bhushan
Manindra Agrawal
Subhashini Ali
Altaf Raja
Atal Bihari Vajpayee
Surinder Amarnath
Abhishek Avasthi
Amin Ullah

B

Baji Rao II
Aparnaa Bajpai
Valentine Bambrick
Frank Bellew
Raghunandan Singh Bhadauria
Abhijeet Bhattacharya
Bryce Chudleigh Burt
James Bush (sportsman)
Harcourt Butler

C

Naresh Chander Chaturvedi
Sharvee Chaturvedi
Cecil Clementi
Sibyl, Lady Colefax
Chaudhary Harmohan Singh Yadav
Kanpur Teachers Constituency

D

Poonam Dhillon
Ashwni Dhir

G

Ganesh Shankar Vidyarthi
Rohan Gavaskar
Anirvan Ghosh
Mahendra Mohan Gupta
Shyam Lal Gupta

H

Harish-Chandra
Sir Henry Havelock-Allan, 1st Baronet
Jan Holden
Adrian A. Husain

I

Shazia Ilmi
Imran Khan (cricketer, born May 1973)

J

Rashid Jahan
Shriprakash Jaiswal
Sunil Jogi

K

Premlata Katiyar
Ajay Kapoor (politician)
Abul Khair Kashfi
Vinay Katiyar
Hard Kaur
Azimullah Khan
Gaurav Khanna
Radhey Shyam Kori
Sucheta Kriplani
Dev Kumar
Kuldeep Yadav

M

 Mina MacKenzie
Ajai Malhotra
Alice Marval
Amit Sadh
Amit Mishra (cricketer, born 1991)
Satish Mishra
Bal Chandra Misra
Gopal Shankar Misra
Mohammad Kaif
Narendra Mohan
Haseena Moin
Henry Montgomery (bishop)
Robert Montgomery (colonial administrator)

N

[Namoh singh]

P

Fanny Parkes
William Peel (Royal Navy officer)

R

Ram Nath Kovind
Raja Ram Pal
Raju Srivastava
Frederick Roberts, 1st Earl Roberts
Clement Daniel Rockey
Pradeep Rohatgi
John Forbes Royle
John Ryan (VC 1857)

S
Saket Kushwaha
Lakshmi Sahgal
Nana Sahib
Satish Mahana
Kratika Sengar
Gopal Sharma
Jagatvir Singh Drona
Anand Shukla
Rajeev Shukla
Rakesh Shukla
Rishabh Shukla
Amit Sial
Anurag Singh
Ram Swaroop Singh
Irfan Solanki
Raju Srivastav
Tanmay Srivastava
Virendra Swarup
Shamim Bano

T

Laxmi Ganesh Tewari
Mowbray Thomson
Aseem Trivedi
Ragini Trivedi

V

Maharishi Valmiki
Atal Bihari Vajpayee
Purnima Verma
Ganesh Shankar Vidyarthi
Salil Vishnoi
Vierendrra Lalit
[[Veena Sahasrabuddhe]

W

Nushoor Wahidi
Bob Woolmer
Sheila Wright

Y

Abhishek Yadav

References

Kanpur
Kanpur-related lists
Kanpur